The Dickey County Courthouse in Ellendale, North Dakota was built in 1910. It is in Beaux Arts architecture and was designed by architects Buechner & Orth.  It was listed on the National Register of Historic Places (1980) in 1980.

Among Buechner & Orth's designs for courthouses, this one's design is apparently nearly identical in that of the Traill County Courthouse, with the exceptions being paired columns on its tower and differing pilasters among the second floor windows.  According to its NRHP nomination, its rotunda is "less exuberant in ornament" than those of most other courthouses designed by Buechner & Orth.

References

Courthouses on the National Register of Historic Places in North Dakota
County courthouses in North Dakota
Beaux-Arts architecture in North Dakota
Government buildings completed in 1910
National Register of Historic Places in Dickey County, North Dakota
1910 establishments in North Dakota